This is a list of the members of the Australian House of Representatives in the Sixth Australian Parliament, which was elected at the 1914 election on 5 September 1914.

There was a significant change in the party system during the Sixth Parliament. There was a split in the Australian Labor Party on 14 November 1916, when the then Prime Minister Billy Hughes walked out of a meeting of the Labor caucus over the issue of conscription along with twenty-four of his supporters, who were all then expelled from the party. Hughes and his followers became the informal "National Labor Party", which formed a minority government until merging with the Commonwealth Liberal Party on 17 February 1917 to form the Nationalist Party of Australia.

Notes

Members of Australian parliaments by term
20th-century Australian politicians